This is a list of graduates, past students and alumni of the Fashion Institute of Technology in New York City.

Alumni

Artists 
Marie-Denise Douyon – Canadian painter, illustrator and graphic artist
Roxanne Lowit – fashion and celebrity photographer
Ryan Ashley Malarkey – tattoo artist, 2007
Janet McKenzie – painter of religious themes
Lady Starlight – performance artist; muse of pop star Lady Gaga
Sara Rahbar (1976) – fine artist, attended 1996–2000
Fabrice Simon – Haitian American abstract artist and fashion designer.
Frederick Weston – African-American gay artist whose collages were recognized for their importance late in his life

Actors, entertainment industry 

 Karen Allen – actress
 Fonzworth Bentley – hip hop artist, entertainer, fashion designer
 Lady Colin Campbell – writer and television personality
Helen Castillo – fashion designer; cast member on season 12 of the reality television series Project Runway
Chloe Dao – winner of the TV series Project Runway (season 2)
Amy Devers – furniture designer and TV personality (Freeform Furniture, Designer People, Trading Spaces)
Amber Lee Ettinger – model and actress
Scarlet Envy – drag queen, contestant on Rupaul's Drag Race season 11 and "Rupaul's Drag Race All Stars" season 6
Caroline Hirsch – founder and owner of Caroline's Comedy Club
Agot Isidro – actress, singer, and TV show host in the Philippines
Kilo Kish – singer/songwriter, textile artist, and painter
Frankie Knuckles – DJ and producer best known for his involvement in pioneering house music.
Melissa McCarthy – film and television actress, comedian, writer and producer; attended for two years
Audrey Quock – model and actress
Joel Schumacher – director, producer, writer, costume designer
Angela Simmons – TV personality, fashion designer, CEO of Pastry Kicks.
Ramona Singer – TV personality, starred on Bravo TV series The Real Housewives of New York City.
Daniel Vosovic – runner-up of TV series Project Runway (season 2)
Jasmine Kennedie - drag queen, trans woman and contestant on Rupaul's Drag Race season 14
Giovanni Palandrani – winner of RuPaul's Drag Race season 10
Joe Zee – Creative Director of Elle Magazine, host of the Sundance Channel's original program All on the Line

Entrepreneurs 

Laure Hériard-Dubreuil – French entrepreneur and founder of a luxury multi-brand retailer, The Webster Miami
Elisabeth Jensen – former Disney Consumer Products executive; education advocate and candidate for United States House of Representatives elections in Kentucky, 2014.

Fashion designers 
Robert Abajian - fashion designer who was Senior Vice President of Liz Claiborne Inc. and succeeded Claiborne as head of design in 1989
Amsale Aberra – fashion designer of couture bridal gowns and eveningwear
Reem Acra – fashion designer of couture bridal gowns and eveningwear
Jhane Barnes – fashion designer
Stephen Burrows – fashion designer, one of the first African-American fashion designer to sell internationally.
David Chu – Fashion designer, president, and CEO of Nautica International, Inc.
Mandy Coon – fashion designer
Francisco Costa – designer, Calvin Klein collection for women
Laura Dahl – fashion designer
Marisol Deluna – fashion designer
Carolina Herrera – fashion designer, President of Carolina Herrera New York
Norma Kamali – fashion designer
Calvin Klein (1962) – founder of Calvin Klein, Inc.
Michael Kors – Fashion designer, President and CEO of Michael Kors
Nanette Lepore – fashion designer and owner, Robespierre, Inc.
Leon Max – Fashion designer, president and CEO of Max Studios
Arthur McGee – fashion designer, first African American designer hired to run a design studio on Seventh Avenue in the Garment District in New York City.
Babette Pinsky, fashion designer
Ralph Rucci (1980) – fashion designer, Chado Ralph Rucci
Kate Stoltz – fashion designer and model
Ivy Supersonic – hat designer
Ouigi Theodore – African-American designer behind the Brooklyn Circus label
Isabel Toledo – fashion designer

Illustrators 

Timothy D. Bellavia – children's author and illustrator
Antonio Lopez, – fashion illustrator

Jewelry, accessories designers 

 Gessica Brooke – fashion and accessories designer
 Carolina Bucci – jewelry designer
 Alicia Goodwin - jewelry designer and founder of Lingua Nigra Jewelry
 David Yurman - jewelry designer

Writers 

Cailli and Sam Beckerman – fashion bloggers
Angie Cruz – novelist and author
Erica De Mane - chef, food writer, cookbook author
Radhika Khanna – fashion designer and author of author of Yoga: From the Ganges to Wall Street and two other books.
Naomi Sims – model and author

Other 

Christine Olender- Assistant General Manager of Windows on the World, 9/11 victim

References

Fashion Institute of Technology people
Fashion Institute of Technology
Fashion Institute of Technology
Fashion Institute of Technology